The SS 90 was a British sports car first built by SS Cars in Coventry, England in 1935. In 1945, the company changed its name to Jaguar.

The car used a six-cylinder side-valve Standard engine of 2663 cc with an output of 50 kW. The engine differed from the one used in the ordinary cars by having Dural connecting rods, an aluminium cylinder head with 7:1 compression ratio, and twin RAG carburettors. 2,642 mm long, the chassis was a shortened version of the one used on the SS 1, and was also supplied by Standard. Suspension was by half-elliptical springs all round, with an underslung back axle. The braking system was Bendix.

The cars rapidly gained attention for their elegant sporting styling, but were not well regarded by the sporting fraternity as their performance did not match their appearance. True sports car performance had to wait for the SS Jaguar 100, which had similar styling and suspension but an engine fitted with an overhead-valve cylinder head.

The SS 90 does not seem to have been tested independently by any magazines, therefore contemporary performance figures are unknown; however, it was widely believed to be capable of reaching 150 km/h. In 1932, the basic tourer cost £395. Twenty-three were made.

The car was 3,810 mm long, 1,600 mm wide, and had a mass of 1,143 kg. When leaving the factory it originally fitted 139.7 × 457.2 Dunlop tyres on 457.2 mm wire wheels. The prototype SS 90, ARW395, was owned by Hugh Kennard from 1938 until at least November 1940. 23 were built, of which 16 survive; the prototype is one of the surviving cars.

Notes 

90
Cars of England
Coupés
Roadsters
Rear-wheel-drive vehicles
Cars introduced in 1935